In social psychology, fundamental attribution error (FAE), also known as correspondence bias or attribution effect, is a cognitive attribution bias where observers under-emphasize situational and environmental explanations for the behavior of an actor while overemphasizing dispositional- and personality-based explanations. This effect has been described as "the tendency to believe that what people do reflects who they are"; that is, to overattribute their behaviors to their personality and underattribute them to the situation or context. Although personality traits and predispositions are considered to be observable facts in psychology, the fundamental attribution error is an error because it misinterprets their effects.

As an example of the behavior which attribution error theory seeks to explain, consider the situation where Alice, a driver, is cut off in traffic by Bob. Alice attributes Bob's behavior to his fundamental personality; e.g., He thinks only of himself, he is selfish, he is an unskilled driver. She does not think it is situational; e.g., He is going to miss his flight, his wife is giving birth at the hospital, his daughter is convulsing at school. Alice might well make the opposite mistake and excuse herself by saying she was influenced by situational causes; e.g., I am late for my job interview, I must pick up my son for his dental appointment, rather than thinking she has a character flaw.

Origin

Etymology 
The phrase was coined by Lee Ross 10 years after an experiment by Edward E. Jones and Victor Harris in 1967. Ross argued in a popular paper that the fundamental attribution error forms the conceptual bedrock for the field of social psychology. Jones wrote that he found Ross's phrase "overly provocative and somewhat misleading", and also joked: "Furthermore, I'm angry that I didn't think of it first." Some psychologists, including Daniel Gilbert, have used the phrase "correspondence bias" for the fundamental attribution error. Other psychologists have argued that the fundamental attribution error and correspondence bias are related but independent phenomena, with the former being a common explanation for the latter.

1967 demonstration study
Jones and Harris hypothesized, based on the correspondent inference theory, that people would attribute apparently freely chosen behaviors to disposition and apparently chance-directed behaviors to situation. The hypothesis was confounded by the fundamental attribution error.

Subjects in an experiment read essays for and against Fidel Castro. Then they were asked to rate the pro-Castro attitudes of the writers. When the subjects believed that the writers freely chose positions for or against Castro, they would normally rate the people who liked Castro as having a more positive attitude towards Castro. However, contradicting Jones and Harris' initial hypothesis, when the subjects were told that the writers' positions were determined by a coin toss, they still rated writers who spoke in favor of Castro as having, on average, a more positive attitude towards Castro than those who spoke against him. In other words, the subjects were unable to properly see the influence of the situational constraints placed upon the writers; they could not refrain from attributing sincere belief to the writers. The experimental group provided more internal attributions towards the writer.

Criticism 
The hypothesis that people systematically overattribute behavior to traits (at least for other people's behavior) is contested. A 1986 study tested whether subjects over-, under-, or correctly estimated the empirical correlation among behaviors. (ie traits, see trait theory) They found that estimates of correlations among behaviors correlated strongly with empirically-observed correlations among these behaviors. Subjects were sensitive to even very small correlations, and their confidence in the association tracked how far they were discrepant (i.e., if they knew when they did not know), and was higher for the strongest relations. Subjects also showed awareness of the effect of aggregation over occasions and used reasonable strategies to arrive at decisions. Epstein concluded that "Far from being inveterate trait believers, as has been previously suggested, [subjects'] intuitions paralleled psychometric principles in several important respects when assessing relations between real-life behaviors."

A 2006 meta-analysis found little support for a related bias, the actor-observer asymmetry, in which people attribute their own behavior more to the environment, but others' behavior to individual attributes. The implications for the fundamental attribution error, the author explained, were mixed. He explained that the fundamental attribution error has two versions:  

 Observers make person-focused attributions more than environmental attributions for actor behavior;
 Observers will mistakenly overestimate the influence of personal factors on actor behavior. 

The meta-analysis concluded that existing weight of evidence does not support the first form of the fundamental attribution error, but does support the second.

Explanations
Several theories predict the fundamental attribution error, and thus both compete to explain it, and can be falsified if it does not occur. Some examples include:
 Just-world fallacy. The belief that people get what they deserve and deserve what they get, the concept of which was first theorized by Melvin J. Lerner in 1977. Attributing failures to dispositional causes rather than situational causes—which are unchangeable and uncontrollable—satisfies our need to believe that the world is fair and that we have control over our lives. We are motivated to see a just world because this reduces our perceived threats, gives us a sense of security, helps us find meaning in difficult and unsettling circumstances, and benefits us psychologically. However, the just-world hypothesis also results in a tendency for people to blame and disparage victims of an accident or a tragedy, such as rape and domestic abuse, to reassure themselves of their insusceptibility to such events. People may even blame the victim's faults in a "past life" to pursue justification for their bad outcome.
 Salience of the actor. We tend to attribute an observed effect to potential causes that capture our attention. When we observe other people, the person is the primary reference point while the situation is overlooked as if it is nothing but mere background. As such, attributions for others' behavior are more likely to focus on the person we see, not the situational forces acting upon that person that we may not be aware of. (When we observe ourselves, we are more aware of the forces acting upon us. Such a differential inward versus outward orientation accounts for the actor–observer bias.)
 Lack of effortful adjustment. Sometimes, even though we are aware that the person's behavior is constrained by situational factors, we still commit the fundamental attribution error. This is because we do not take into account behavioral and situational information simultaneously to characterize the dispositions of the actor. Initially, we use the observed behavior to characterize the person by automaticity. We need to make deliberate and conscious effort to adjust our inference by considering the situational constraints. Therefore, when situational information is not sufficiently taken into account for adjustment, the uncorrected dispositional inference creates the fundamental attribution error. This would also explain why people commit the fundamental attribution error to a greater degree when they're under cognitive load; i.e. when they have less motivation or energy for processing the situational information.
 Culture. It has been suggested cultural differences occur in attribution error: people from individualistic (Western) cultures are reportedly more prone to the error while people from collectivistic cultures are less prone.  Based on cartoon-figure presentations to Japanese and American subjects, it has been suggested that collectivist subjects may be more influenced by information from context (for instance being influenced more by surrounding faces in judging facial expressions). Alternatively, individualist subjects may favor processing of focal objects, rather than contexts.  Others suggest Western individualism is associated with viewing both oneself and others as independent agents, therefore focusing more on individuals rather than contextual details.

Versus correspondence bias

The fundamental attribution error is commonly used interchangeably with "correspondence bias" (sometimes called "correspondence inference"), although this phrase refers to a judgment which does not necessarily constitute a bias, which arises when the inference drawn is incorrect, e.g. dispositional inference when the actual cause is situational). However, there has been debate about whether the two terms should be distinguished from each other. Three main differences between these two judgmental processes have been argued:
 They seem to be elicited under different circumstances, as both correspondent dispositional inferences and situational inferences can be elicited spontaneously. Attributional processing, however, seems to only occur when the event is unexpected or conflicting with prior expectations. This notion is supported by a 1994 study, which found that different types of verbs invited different inferences and attributions. Correspondence inferences were invited to a greater degree by interpretative action verbs (such as "to help") than state action or state verbs, thus suggesting that the two are produced under different circumstances.
 Correspondence inferences and causal attributions also differ in automaticity. Inferences can occur spontaneously if the behavior implies a situational or dispositional inference, while causal attributions occur much more slowly.
 It has also been suggested that correspondence inferences and causal attributions are elicited by different mechanisms. It is generally agreed that correspondence inferences are formed by going through several stages. Firstly, the person must interpret the behavior, and then, if there is enough information to do so, add situational information and revise their inference. They may then further adjust their inferences by taking into account dispositional information as well. Causal attributions however seem to be formed either by processing visual information using perceptual mechanisms, or by activating knowledge structures (e.g. schemas) or by systematic data analysis and processing. Hence, due to the difference in theoretical structures, correspondence inferences are more strongly related to behavioral interpretation than causal attributions.

Based on the preceding differences between causal attribution and correspondence inference, some researchers argue that the fundamental attribution error should be considered as the tendency to make dispositional rather than situational explanations for behavior, whereas the correspondence bias should be considered as the tendency to draw correspondent dispositional inferences from behavior. With such distinct definitions between the two, some cross-cultural studies also found that cultural differences of correspondence bias are not equivalent to those of fundamental attribution error. While the latter has been found to be more prevalent in individualistic cultures than collectivistic cultures, correspondence bias occurs across cultures, suggesting differences between the two phrases. Further, disposition correspondent inferences made to explain the behavior of nonhuman actors (e.g., robots) do not necessarily constitute an attributional error because there is little meaningful distinction between the interior dispositions and observable actions of machine agents.

See also

 Attribution (psychology)
 Base rate fallacy
 Cognitive miser
 Dispositional attribution
 Explanatory style

Cognitive biases

 Actor-observer asymmetry
 Attributional bias
 Cognitive bias
 Defensive attribution hypothesis
 False consensus effect
 Group attribution error
 List of cognitive biases
 Locus of control
 Omission bias
 Ultimate attribution error
 Extrinsic incentives bias

References

Further reading

 Heider, Fritz. (1958). The Psychology of Interpersonal Relations. New York, John Wiley & Sons. .
 Gleitman, H., Fridlund, A., & Reisberg D. (1999). Psychology webBOOK: Psychology Fifth Edition / Basic Psychology Fifth Edition. W. W. Norton and Company. Accessed online 18 April 2006.

External links
 Detailed explanations by Lee Ross and Richard Nisbett

Cognitive biases
Attitude attribution
Error